Eddie Ellison was a retired English Detective Chief Superintendent of police who is famous for arguing for drug legalisation.  He died from cancer on 29 January 2007. He continued to write and give presentations on policing and drug policy up to his death.

Career
Ellison spent two years as a Detective Sergeant at London's Heathrow Airport combatting drug smuggling with Her Majesty's Customs and Excise officers.  He then spent two years working against drugs suppliers and distributors across London.  Ellison returned to the Scotland Yard's Central Drug Squad as Detective Chief Inspector where he commanded the squad for three years.  As Detective Chief Superintendent heading the Crime Policy Group of Specialist Operations Department he later joined the Association of Chief Police Officers review teams that restructured the Regional Crime Squads and Drug Wings and worked with the team that justified and created the National Criminal Intelligence Service (NCIS).  In 1993 he retired.

Quotes
"Each and every police officer has their own ranking of the relative seriousness of all criminal offences that is often based on their background experiences. However hard they try, their attitudes and behaviour are often affected by that assessment. I have never, and can never, see the drug user as a 'criminal'. I see them as, amongst other descriptions, a rebellious youth, a risk taking idiot, a seeker of relief, a lobbyist for independent thought and freedom, someone in need of guidance and help or a very real exasperation to parents and friends. But in as much as the drug use is concerned, not a criminal and therefore the criminal law cannot be the appropriate weapon to counter or deter a choice of use."—Eddie Ellison

External links
Eddie's website

Living people
Year of birth missing (living people)